Foreign Office Architects, FOA, was an architectural design studio headed by former husband and wife team Farshid Moussavi and Alejandro Zaera-Polo. The London-based studio, which was established in 1993, specialised in architectural design, master planning and interior design services for both public and private sector clients. Following the end of the couple's marriage, the winding up of the studio's activities was announced in December 2009. The establishment of two new practices, FMA (Farshid Moussavi Architecture) and London/Barcelona based AZPA Limited followed in 2011.

History 
The "Foreign" in the company's name referred to the principal's' heritage, with Zaera–Polo hailing from Spain and Moussavi from Iran. The company produced architectural projects in Japan, the United States, the Netherlands and Spain.

FOA emerged as one of the most significant architecture and urban design practices of its time, and become known for combining technical innovation with design excellence. FOA's designers were critically acclaimed, and won several awards. In their approach to architecture, the designers were hailed as new pragmatists, employing technical rigor in their focus on organic growth and the evolution of design ‘species’ hybridizing uses relating to both local and global conditions. Their work addressed a variety of locations and typologies.

The studio's first project, which is considered its landmark achievement, was the Yokohama Pier Port Terminal in Japan. The Terminal has been described as a hybrid of non-Cartesian industrial infrastructure and versatile social functionality. The commission was awarded after an international competition held in 1995; the terminal was completed in 2002.

Work
In the UK:

In Spain: (where FOA maintained a local office branch)

the La Rioja Technology Transfer Center, Logrono
Bamboo Building, a social housing in Madrid
A 50,000m2 coastal park with outdoor auditoria in Barcelona
Police headquarters in La Villajoyosa
Municipal Theatre in Torrevieja
The Institute of Legal Medicine in Madrid
The D-38 Office Complex in Barcelona
A Villa in Pedralbes, Barcelona
The Hotel Masaveu in Gijón
A Residential Tower in Durango

Projects in other European locations:
The Blue Moon Hotel in Groningen, the Netherlands
The Umraniye Retail Complex and Multiplex, in Istanbul, Turkey
The Mahler 4 office building in Amsterdam
The future Aerospace Campus in Toulouse, France

Projects in Asia:
The Spanish Pavilion at the 2005 Aichi International Expo in Japan
A headquarters building for Dulnyouk Publishers, Paju, South Korea
Two 180m high residential towers at the World Business Centre in Busan, South Korea
The KL Sentral Plot D Residential Towers in Kuala Lumpur, Malaysia

In the USA:
The Museum of Contemporary Art in Cleveland, Ohio, United States

FOA won several prestigious competitions and commissions, including the BBC Music Box for the firm’s White City complex in 2003. The practice played a central creative role in the Masterplanning team for the London 2012 Olympics Park, site-wide infrastructure and accompanying long-term regeneration of the Lower Lea Valley (2002–2007) and was selected as part of the United Architects team to submit a design for the World Trade Center in New York in 2002, in the aftermath of 9/11.

Awards

Architects of the Year Award by Architectural Digest Magazine in Madrid.

Exhibitions
FOA Yokohama International Port Terminal, Architectural Association, London, 1–24 June 1995
Solo exhibition at the 8th Venice Architecture Biennale in 2002
FOA Breeding Architecture, ICA, London, 29 November 2003 – 28 February 2004
FOA Designing Modern Britain, Design Museum, 2006
FOA projects have been exhibited at the Museum of Modern Art in New York and at the Max Protetch Gallery.

Further reading
The practice has been published in numerous monographs and catalogues globally:
Foreign Office Architects: Working, University of Michigan Press, 2005
FOA's ark evolving container for the proliferating singularities, Korean Architecture and Culture Magazine, December 2004
Phylogenesis: FOA’s ark, Foreign Office, A monograph by Actar, Barcelona, Spain, 2003
Complexity and consistency, A monograph, issue 115/116, El Croquis, Madrid, Spain, 2003
The Yokohama Project, a monograph, Actar, Barcelona, Spain, 2003
FOA Recent Projects, Text by Jeffrey Kipnis, Ciro Najle & Alejandro Zaera Polo, published as 2G no.16, Barcelona, Spain, 2001
Agneta Eriksson, Foreign Office Architects, Eriksson + Ronnefalk Forlag, 2001

References

External links

e-architect
Farshid Moussavi Architecture
AZPA Limited

Architecture firms based in London